Airgo Academy, also known as Airgo International Flight School, is a flight school headquartered at Centralia Municipal Airport in Centralia, Illinois. The flight school specializes in training international student pilots and reportedly graduates 80 to 100 students in a typical year. The flight school has a satellite location at the Veterans Airport of Southern Illinois.

The flight school is certified under 14 CFR Part 141, allowing its graduates to fly for U.S.-based airlines with a reduced number of hours on a restricted airline transport pilot license.

The school has a specialized bridge program between American and Chinese training programs, so the school has a high number of Chinese students training for their commercial licenses.

Besides a flight school, Airgo also operates an on-demand charter airline certified under 14 CFR Part 135 and previously operated as an aircraft dealership.

References 

Organizations based in Illinois
Aviation schools in the United States